Ražice is a municipality and village in Písek District in the South Bohemian Region of the Czech Republic. It has about 400 inhabitants.

Administrative parts
The village of Štětice is an administrative part of Ražice.

References

Villages in Písek District